Beulah Lodge, in the small community of Beulah near Dawson Springs, Kentucky, is a two-story frame structure built in 1908. A one-story rear addition was added in c.1940.  It was listed on the National Register of Historic Places in 1989.

It was built in part as a meeting hall for the Beulah Lodge 609 F & AM (Free and Accepted Masons) (which, as of 2018 still uses the second floor as its lodge hall), and to serve as a worship space for the local community (its first floor has served various church congregations as a worship space).

References

Clubhouses on the National Register of Historic Places in Kentucky
Neoclassical architecture in Kentucky
Cultural infrastructure completed in 1908
National Register of Historic Places in Hopkins County, Kentucky
Masonic buildings in Kentucky
1908 establishments in Kentucky
Churches on the National Register of Historic Places in Kentucky
Churches completed in 1908